"The Other Side of Life" is a 1986 single by The Moody Blues. It was first released in May 1986 as the title track on the album The Other Side of Life. It was released as a single in August 1986, the second single released from the album, the first being "Your Wildest Dreams".  After its release, it became a major success in the United States, making #11 and #18 on the adult contemporary and mainstream rock charts respectively. It also reached #58 on the Billboard Hot 100 chart.

Reception
Billboard said it is a "bluesy shuffle with a light, lyrical texture."  Cash Box praised the music and poetry and said the tune is helped by "bright synthesizers."

Chart history

Personnel
 Justin Hayward: acoustic guitar, electric guitar, vocals
 John Lodge: bass guitar
 Patrick Moraz: keyboards
 Graeme Edge: drums, percussion

References

External links
 "The Other Side of Life" official music video (YouTube)

1986 singles
The Moody Blues songs
Songs written by Justin Hayward
Song recordings produced by Tony Visconti
1986 songs
Polydor Records singles